"Hi, How Ya Doin'?" is a song written by Steve Horton and performed by Kenny G, released  by Arista Records. Uncredited vocals were provided by Barry Johnson. It reached number 23 on the U.S. Billboard R&B Singles chart in 1984.

Track listing
 Promotional 12" single
 "Hi, How Ya Doin'?" (Remix Version) – 5:47   
 "Hi, How Ya Doin'?" (LP Version) – 5:37   
 "Hi, How Ya Doin'?" (Instrumental Version) – 4:18

Chart positions

References

1984 singles
Kenny G songs
1984 songs
Arista Records singles
Songs written by Wayne Brathwaite